" is a song recorded by Japanese singer Eve. It was released on October 3, 2020 by Toy's Factory. It was used as the first opening theme for the anime series Jujutsu Kaisen.

Background and production 
On August 11, 2020, it was announced that the single would be used as the opening theme song for the anime Jujutsu Kaisen, which would begin airing from October. The release date was revealed on September 19, and at the same time, the third promotional video of the animation using this song was released on YouTube.

It was Eve's first release after his last song 10 months earlier. The singer, who had been reading the manga for some time, said he was "impressed" that his song was chosen as the opening song, and commented as follows:

Producing the song, Eve reread the manga from the first volume to the last and redefined the image of the work. He stated that he first produced a 90-second demo and then, at the request of the anime director, added a large chorus-like development to the chorus part to add a violent melody. On the production, Eve said, "I think my voice is pretty light, so they made me think about how to sing a heavy, dark, fast-paced song with that voice. I hadn't been conscious of my songwriting until now, so it was a song that I had a deep feeling for," he said.

Composition 
The song is an upper tune characterized by a fast and heavy sound and dramatically developing melody. While the sound of the first verse is based on a fast band sound with solid guitars, the arrangement switches to a trap-like mid-tempo groove in the A-melody section of the second verse.

Some of the lyrics overlap the plot of Jujutsu Kaisen, with many phrases recalling the fate of the protagonist, Yuji Itadori, and foreshadowing future events.

Music video 
The music video is directed by Yuichiro Saeki and uses footage from the anime. It was released on YouTube on November 20, 2020 and surpassed 100 million views on April 13, 2021.

On March 26, 2021, a live video presentation was released on YouTube to celebrate the video reaching 100 million views.

Critical reception 
Satoru Ryusei of Real Sound commented that "we can enjoy the sound, something very typical of anime songs, and at the same time, it seems to represent the light and dark sides of sorcerers who have their own dark pasts and bitter experiences and yet move forward with their own beliefs". Kari Komatsu of Rockin' On says, "the song is less than four minutes long, but is infused with a wealth of sounds and arrangements, including effective vocal effects, and vividly reflects the struggle to get through a chaotic world."

Charts

Weekly charts

Awards and nominations

References 

2021 singles
2021 songs
Anime songs
Toy's Factory singles